A relative term is a term that makes two or more distinct references to objects (which may be the same object, for example in "The Morning Star is the Evening Star"). A relative term is typically expressed in ordinary language by means of a phrase with explicit or implicit blanks. Examples:
 __ loves 
 __ is the same object as __
 __ is giver of __ to __. 
The word is is a relative term when it expresses identity.

The colloquial meaning for a relative term is that it is different for different people or situations. An example: someone who is 5 feet tall might think someone who is 5 feet six inches tall is tall, but someone who is 6 feet would think that that person is short. An atom is big compared to a quark, but it is very small when compared to a body cell. Fast food may be healthier than preserved food, but unhealthy compared to organic produce.

See also
 Theory of relationship 

Term logic